The SNCF locomotives BB 201 to BB 220 were a class of 1500 V DC 4-axle electric locomotives originally built for the Chemin de fer de Paris à Orléans in the 1920s.

Originally built for mixed services between Paris and Bordeaux, the locomotives were soon used primarily for freight trains. During the 1960 the locomotives were transferred to shunting duties and the top speed lowered. The first four units were withdrawn in 1967, the remaining units, differed slightly in the electrical components were finally all out of service by 1978.

See also
SNCF BB 1-80, SNCF BB 100, SNCF BB 1320, SNCF BB 1420 - similar locomotives, part of the same order of 200 locomotives

References

Literature

External links

E.0201
00200
Standard gauge electric locomotives of France
1500 V DC locomotives
Railway locomotives introduced in 1924
Bo′Bo′ locomotives

Scrapped locomotives